David Perry Hazeltine (born October 27, 1958) is an American jazz pianist, composer, arranger, and educator.

Early life
Hazeltine was born in Milwaukee, Wisconsin, on October 27, 1958. He began studying the piano at the age of nine, and first performed professionally when he was thirteen. He attended the Wisconsin College Conservatory of Music from 1976 to 1979.

Later life and career

1980–1992
Hazeltine worked around Chicago, Minneapolis, and Milwaukee, and was the regular pianist for the Milwaukee Jazz Gallery. He obtained a BA from the University of Wisconsin in 1991. After performing with Chet Baker at the Milwaukee Jazz Gallery, the trumpeter suggested he should move to New York City, which he did in 1981. After two years, "domestic considerations prompted a return to his home town". He returned to the Wisconsin College Conservatory of Music, and was the chairman of the jazz department from 1985 to 1992. In 1992, he returned to New York.

1993–present
In New York, Hazeltine led a trio that included Peter Washington on bass and Louis Hayes on drums. He also worked with the Carnegie Hall Jazz Band, Slide Hampton's big band, and the group One for All. His first solo album, Four Flights Up, appeared in 1995.

He has spent time composing, but has stated that he does not find it easy. Although he is a pianist, he feels influenced more by saxophonists, particularly Charlie Parker.

Discography

As leader/co-leader

As sideman
With Eric Alexander
Temple of Olympic Zeus (HighNote, 2007)
With Javon Jackson
Sugar Hill: The Music of Duke Ellington and Billy Strayhorn (Chesky)
With Jesse van Ruller
Here and There (Criss Cross, 2002)

References

External links
Official site
One for All at AllMusic

Musicians from Milwaukee
Wisconsin Conservatory of Music alumni
American jazz pianists
American male pianists
1958 births
Living people
Chesky Records artists
20th-century American pianists
21st-century American pianists
20th-century American male musicians
21st-century American male musicians
American male jazz musicians
One for All (band) members
Smoke Sessions Records artists
Criss Cross Jazz artists